Agnes of Holstein (died 1386) was a Countess of Holstein-Kiel by birth and by marriage a Duchess of Saxe-Lauenburg. She was the daughter of Count John III of Holstein-Plön (d. 1359) and Catherine (d. 1327), daughter of Duke Henry III of Silesia-Glogau.

She died in 1386 and was buried in the Cathedral in Ratzeburg.

Marriages and descendants 
On 22 March 1327 in Trittau, Agnes was engaged to marry Duke Eric II of Saxe-Lauenburg (d. 1368 or 1369).  The wedding took place between 1342 and 1349.  They had four children:

 Eric IV (1354–1412), Duke of Saxe-Lauenburg
 Agnes († after 1387), married to Duke William of Brunswick-Lüneburg (d. 1369)
 Jutta (d. 1388), married to Duke Bogislaw VI of Pomerania (d. 1393)
 Mechthild (died after 1405), Abbess of Wienhausen Abbey

She was an ancestor of Anne of Cleves.

Ancestors 

Duchesses of Saxe-Lauenburg
Year of birth uncertain
1386 deaths
14th-century German nobility
14th-century German women
Daughters of monarchs